Conor Kearns (born March 12, 1993) is an Irish-American rugby union player who last played wing, fullback and fly-half for the San Diego Legion, the USA under-20's and the USA Selects.

Early life
Kearns was born in San Francisco to Irish parents originally from Dublin. When Kearns was still a child the family moved to Limerick where he would grow up playing with Old Crescent.

University
Kearns completed a degree in Molecular Medicine and Immunology at Trinity College and competed with the university's rugby club in the AIL league. He went onto to pursue a Master's in Pharmacology at the University of Oxford, where he also played for the rugby club in the famed Varsity match against Cambridge. Kearns captained the team in their 20–10 defeat to Cambridge at Twickenham in 2017. He also took part in their 38–16 victory in the 2018 Varsity Match. Kearns made an appearance for the Munster A side against the Ireland under-20s in April 2016.

Major League Rugby
Kearns played on the wing in San Diego's 23–26 loss to Seattle in the 2019 Major League Rugby final.

International
Kearns played five matches for the USA under-20's at the 2013 IRB Junior World Championship. Kearns also competed for the Irish Universities team in a 2016 match against an England Students side. Kearns was selected for the All-Americans three match tour of Australia in 2016, where he served as the team's starting fly-half in two of their three matches. Kearns made three appearances for the USA Selects during the 2018 Americas Pacific Challenge.

References 

1993 births
American rugby union players
Living people
Rugby union fly-halves